Josef Mach (25 February 1909, in Prostějov – 7 July 1987, in Prague) was a Czech actor, screenwriter and film director.

Josef Mach worked as a journalist and stage performer at the beginning of his career, then in 1938 was appointed assistant director of short films at Grafo Film Studio working with director Václav Kubásek.  From 1946 Mach directed many feature films for Barrandov Studios in Prague. He is best known for The Sons of Great Bear, a 1966 Red Western film that he directed for the East German DEFA film studio.

Filmography

Sources
 Josef Mach at České filmové nebe (Czech Film Heaven)

References

External links

 Josef Mach at the DEFA Film Library Catalog

1909 births
1987 deaths
Czech film directors
Czech screenwriters
Male screenwriters
Czech male film actors
German-language film directors
20th-century Czech male actors
20th-century screenwriters
Male Western (genre) film actors